Lytoceras is an ammonite genus that was extant during most of the Jurassic and Cretaceous periods, and is the type genus for the family Lytoceratidae. These cephalopods were fast-moving nektonic carnivores.

Description
Shells of Lytoceras are evolute, round or quadrate in section, covered with crinkled growth lines or riblets, and may have slight constrictions on internal molds. Some have fine striations, (parallel grooves running longitudinally along the flanks).

Distribution
Fossils of species within this genus have been found in the Jurassic and Cretaceous rocks all over the world, particularly in Western Europe, Morocco, Madagascar, South Africa and United States.

References

Systematic descriptions, Mesozoic Ammonoidea, by W.J Arkell, Bernhard Kummel, and C.W. Wright. 1957. Treatise on Invertebrate Paleontology, Part L. Geological Society of America and University of Kansas press.

Jurassic ammonites
Cretaceous ammonites
Ammonites of Europe
Sinemurian genus first appearances
Pliensbachian genera
Toarcian genera
Aalenian genera
Bajocian genera
Bathonian genera
Callovian genera
Oxfordian genera
Kimmeridgian genera
Tithonian genera
Berriasian genera
Valanginian genera
Hauterivian genera
Barremian genera
Aptian genera
Albian genera
Cenomanian genus extinctions
Ammonites of Asia
Ammonitida genera
Lytoceratidae